The third round of the 1999–2000 UEFA Cup began on 23 November 1999. The round included 24 winners from the second round and eight third-placed teams from the Champions League first group stage.

Matches 

|}

First leg

Second leg

Borussia Dortmund 2–2 Rangers on aggregate. Borussia Dortmund won 3–1 on penalties.

Juventus won 4–3 on aggregate.

Werder Bremen won 4–3 on aggregate.

Galatasaray won 3–2 on aggregate.

Lens won 5–3 on aggregate.

Parma won 5–4 on aggregate.

Slavia Prague won 5–2 on aggregate.

AS Monaco won 3–2 on aggregate.

Deportivo La Coruña won 5–3 on aggregate.

Bayer Leverkusen 2–2 Udinese on aggregate. Udinese won on away goals rule.

Arsenal won 6–3 on aggregate.

Leeds United 2–2 Spartak Moscow on aggregate. Leeds United won on away goals rule.

Roma won 1–0 on aggregate.

Celta Vigo won 8–1 on aggregate.

Atlético Madrid won 5–3 on aggregate.

Mallorca won 3–0 on aggregate.

External links
Third Round Information
RSSSF Page
Worldfootball.net Page

1999–2000 UEFA Cup